Linda White may refer to:

 Linda White (Alpha Kappa Alpha), American sorority president
 Linda White (politician), Australian politician